Shahidul Islam Bakul is a Bangladesh Awami League politician and the incumbent Member of Parliament of Natore-1.

Career
Bakul was elected to parliament from Natore-1 as a Bangladesh Awami League candidate 30 December 2018. Before election, his supporters blocked train service at his area demanding his nomination to the ruling party. Bakul is a member of the Parliamentary Standing Committee on Ministry of Fisheries & Livestock.

References

Awami League politicians
Living people
11th Jatiya Sangsad members
1972 births